Oracle Data Integrator (ODI) is an Extract, load and transform (ELT) (in contrast with the ETL common approach) tool produced by Oracle that offers a graphical environment to build, manage and maintain data integration processes in business intelligence systems.

History 

Oracle purchased Sunopsis in October 2006 and re-branded it as Oracle Data Integrator (ODI). The aim of this acquisition was to enhance the Oracle Fusion Middleware offering, which required broad support to heterogeneous sources and targets. After the purchase Oracle continued to offer separately ODI as well as its former ETL product Oracle Warehouse Builder. In January 2010 Oracle announced their intention to merge them into a single product (Oracle Data Integrator Enterprise Edition).

Components 

Oracle Data Integrator comprises the following components:

 The Modular Repository, made up of a master repository and of one or several work repositories to store metadata about the data integration process. These repositories can be installed on any database engine that supports ANSI ISO 89 syntax.
 The graphical interface modules (topology manager, designer, security manager, operator) and the execution agents (agent). These are entirely built with Java components that give access to the repository in client/server mode.
 Metadata Navigator, a Servlet/JSP application that enables access to the repository through a Web interface.
 Lightweight Designer, a Web application to view and edit objects in the repository through a Web browser.
 Oracle Data Integrator Public Web Services, which allow users to leverage Oracle Data Integrator features in a Service-oriented architecture (SOA).

References

External links 
 Overview of Oracle Data Integrator
 Oracle Data Integrator and Oracle Warehouse Builder Statement of Direction

Extract, transform, load tools
Oracle software